Amit Prasher is an Indian film director. His work as a filmmaker include the films Tu Mera 22 Main Tera 22 and Ishq Brandy.

Filmography

Director

Assistant Director

References

External links
 

Living people
Film directors from Punjab, India
1980 births
Hindi-language film directors
Punjabi-language film directors